James William Forsyth (August 8, 1834 – October 24, 1906) was a U.S. Army officer and general. He was primarily a Union staff officer during the American Civil War and cavalry regimental commander during the Indian Wars. Forsyth is best known for having commanded the 7th Cavalry at the Wounded Knee Massacre on December 29, 1890 during which more than 250 men, women, and children of the Lakota were killed and more than 50 were wounded.

Early life
Forsyth was born in Maumee, Ohio, where he attended the local schools. He attended West Point from 1851 to 1856 and received a commission as second lieutenant in Co. D, 9th U.S. Infantry. He was instrumental in the completion of the frontier fort at San Juan Island and served as the company's acting commander when Captain George E. Pickett was away on leave. After serving in Washington Territory at Fort Bellingham and Camp Pickett, San Juan Island, Forsyth was promoted to first lieutenant in 1861 and returned to the East to command Union forces in the Civil War.

Career

Civil War

Forsyth joined the Union Army as Colonel of the 64th Ohio Infantry on 9 November 1861.  He was temporarily in command of a brigade during Don Carlos Buell's march to the relief of Maj. Gen. U.S. Grant at Shiloh.  However, the day before the battle began the brigade's regular commander, James A. Garfield, returned and Forsyth did not participate in the actual battle.  Forsyth relinquished command of the 64th Ohio to Colonel John Ferguson on 1 January 1862.

In 1862 he transferred to the Army of the Potomac where he served as the assistant U.S. inspector general during the Peninsular Campaign.  During the Maryland Campaign he was assigned as aide-de-camp to Major General Joseph K. F. Mansfield until the latter's untimely death at the Battle of Antietam.  Forsyth then became provost marshal to the Army of the Potomac at the Battle of Fredericksburg.

In 1863 Forsyth transferred back to the Western Theater to serve as adjutant to General Philip H. Sheridan at Chickamauga. Forsyth was brevetted to Major in the Regular Army for his service Chickamauga.  When Sheridan transferred to the Army of the Potomac's Cavalry Corps, Forsyth followed as his chief of staff.  He participated in this capacity during the Overland Campaign.  He was subsequently chief of staff of the Army of the Shenandoah during the Shenandoah Valley Campaign of 1864 and chief of staff to the Union Cavalries during the Appomattox Campaign. He received brevets to Lieutenant Colonel, USA for Cedar Creek, colonel, USA for Five Forks and Brigadier General, U.S. Volunteers, for the Shenandoah Valley Campaign.

On January 13, 1866, President Andrew Johnson promoted Forsyth to  Brigadier General of Volunteers to rank from May 19, 1865. The U.S. Senate confirmed the appointment on February 23, 1866, notwithstanding that Forsyth was mustered out of the volunteer service on January 15, 1866. On July 17, 1866, President Johnson nominated Forsyth for appointment as a brevet Brigadier General in the regular army to rank from April 9, 1865.  The Senate confirmed the appointment on July 23, 1866.

Forsyth served under Sheridan  along with Wesley Merritt, Thomas Devin, and George A. Custer. Later, all of these men would become famous Indian fighters.

After the war, Forsyth joined the Military Order of the Loyal Legion of the United States.

Promotions during the Civil War

 1st Lieutenant, 9th Infantry (Regular Army) 15 March 1861
 Transferred to 18th Infantry 14 May 1861
 Captain, 18th Infantry (Regular Army) 24 October 1861
 Brevet Major 20 September 1863 (Chickamauga, Georgia)
 Major (Volunteers) 7 April 1864 (Assistant Adjutant General)
 Lieutenant Colonel (Volunteers) 19 April 1864 (Assistant Inspector General)
 Brevet Lieutenant Colonel 19 October 1864 (Cedar Creek, Virginia)
 Brevet Brigadier General of Volunteers 9 May 1865 (for actions in the Valley Campaign)
 Brevet Colonel 1 April 1865 (Five Forks, Virginia)
 Brevet Brigadier General 9 April 1865 (for action at Five Forks)

Indian Wars
Forsyth remained in the Regular Army after the end of the Civil War. He commanded a brigade of cavalry for two years and was a strong supporter of African Americans and buffalo soldiers. He then joined Sheridan again in 1867, and moved with him when he became commander of the Department of the Missouri in 1866. Forsyth served first as the department's secretary and then as inspector, with an appointment in the cavalry. He took part in military campaigns against the Comanche, Cheyenne, Arapaho, and Kiowa Indians in 1868–69. Forsyth went to Europe in 1870 as an official observer of the Franco-Prussian War.

In 1878 Forsyth commanded the 1st U.S. Cavalry in the Bannock War, having considerable success in this role. In 1885 Forsyth was in command of Fort Maginnis, Montana where the army was monitoring the Crow, Cree, and the Gros Ventres (Atsina) Indians.

On July 11, 1886, after a leave of absence of two months, Forsyth was promoted to Colonel of the 7th U.S. Cavalry, assumed command of the regiment July 26, 1886, at Fort Meade, South Dakota and marched to Fort Riley, Kansas, where he arrived September 8, 1887, where he remained in command until Nov. 10th, 1890, during which time he organized and developed the system of instruction for light artillery and cavalry for the School of Application for Infantry and Cavalry. Forsyth was in command of the 7th Cavalry at the Wounded Knee Massacre on December 29, 1890 and at the Drexel Mission Fight that took place on the Pine Ridge Indian Reservation on December 30, 1890.

On November 9, 1894, Brigadier General Alexander McDowell McCook was promoted to major general to hold the position vacated by the retirement of Major General Oliver O. Howard.  Colonel Forsyth was promoted to the rank of brigadier general to succeed McCook, and was appointed commander of the Department of California.

On May 11, 1897 Forsyth was promoted to major general to succeed Major General Frank Wheaton who had retired on May 8.  Forsyth retired from the Army three days later.

Forsyth married the daughter of Ohio Governor William Dennison. The couple had four children.  He died on October 24, 1906 in Columbus, Ohio, and is buried in Green Lawn Cemetery.

Promotions after the Civil War
(All in the Regular Army)

 Major, 10th Cavalry 28 July 1866
 Lieutenant Colonel, 1st Cavalry 4 April 1878
 Colonel, 7th Cavalry 11 June 1886
 Brigadier General 9 November 1894 (Dept of California)
 Major General 11 May 1897

Memorials
 The Town of Forsyth, Montana (Rosebud County) is named in his honor.
 Camp Forsyth on Ft. Riley, Kansas is also named in his honor.

See also

List of American Civil War generals (Union)

Notes

References
 Eicher, John H., and Eicher, David J., Civil War High Commands, Stanford University Press, 2001, .
 James W. Forsyth Papers. Yale Collection of Western Americana, Beinecke Rare Book and Manuscript Library.
 DeMontravel, Peter R., A Hero to His Fighting Men: Nelson A. Miles, the Kent State University Press
 "The New York Times": Col. Forsyth Exonerated

Archives
James W. Forsyth Family Papers 1803–2004. 6.82 cubic feet.  At the University of Washington Libraries Special Collections.
Edmond S. Meany papers. 1877–1935. 71.86 cubic feet.  At the University of Washington Libraries Special Collections.
James W. Forsyth Papers. Yale Collection of Western Americana, Beinecke Rare Book and Manuscript Library.

1834 births
1906 deaths
United States Military Academy alumni
Union Army generals
People from Maumee, Ohio
People of Ohio in the American Civil War
Pine Ridge Campaign
Burials at Green Lawn Cemetery (Columbus, Ohio)